The 2022 Qatar FA Cup was the second edition of the Qatari cup tournament in men's football. It was played by the bottom 8 teams from the Qatar Stars League and the entire Qatari Second Division.

The tournament featured 16 teams divided into 3 groups.

Round One Groups

Standings

Group A

Results

Group B

Results

Group C

Results

Knockout round

Quarter-finals

Semi-finals

Final

References

Football cup competitions in Qatar
Qatar FA Cup